MSW may stand for:

Businesses and organisations
 Manatawny Still Works, a craft distillery in Pottstown, Pennsylvania, United States
 Massawa International Airport, Eritrea (by IATA code)
 Ministry of Interior (Poland)

Science and technology
 Metres sea water, a unit of pressure
 Mikheyev–Smirnov–Wolfenstein effect, in particle physics
 MSWLogo, an interpreted computer programming language
 Machine Status Word, a data segment in the Intel 286 LOADALL instruction set
 Microsoft Windows, the most popular operating system for IBM PC-architecture computers

Other uses
 Mao Shan Wang, a popular cultivar of durian
 Master of Social Work, a postgraduate qualification and academic title
 Municipal solid waste